The Pater Noster cord (also spelled Paternoster Cord and called Paternoster beads) is a set of prayer beads used in Christianity to recite the 150 Psalms, as well as the Lord's Prayer. As such, Paternoster cords traditionally consist of 150 beads that are prayed once or 50 beads that are prayed thrice; one end of the Paternoster cord has a Christian cross and the other end has a tassel. In the medieval era, those persons who were illiterate simply recited the Lord's Prayer (known as the Pater Noster in Ecclesiastical Latin) 150 times instead of the 150 Psalms, hence giving these Christian prayer beads the name of the Paternoster cord.

Development and use 
In the 3rd century, the early Christian Desert Fathers carried pebbles in pouches to count their praying of the Psalms. The Pater Noster Cord originated in the 8th century in Ireland, as a way to count the recitation of the one hundred and fifty Psalms in the Bible, which are incorporated into the fixed prayer times of Christianity. Those who could not read or had difficulty memorizing the canonical hours prayed the Lord's Prayer one hundred and fifty times. Ropes of 150 knots prayed once or ropes of 50 knots (to be counted thrice) were made, giving the Pater Noster Cord its current form. The use of the Paternoster Cords spread throughout Western Christendom.

The Pater Noster cord has been carried by Christians who wear it off of their girdle or belt, or also hang it off of "the neck or wrist or arm". Others have worn the Pater Noster cord by attaching it to a brooch worn on the breast, or simply carrying it in their hand.

Assemblage 
The making of Paternoster Cords in the Middle Ages was done by guilds who were distinguished based on the kind of materials they used to assemble them ("coral and shell, amber and jet, or bone and horn").

In the present day, religious orders such as the Solitaries of DeKoven (a community of Anglican hermits) make Pater Noster cords to support themselves.

See also 
Breviary
Chotki
 The rosary has Pater Noster beads.

References 

Christian prayer
Prayer beads
Psalms
Lord's Prayer